The Many Glacier Barn and Bunkhouse in Glacier National Park, also known as Packer's Roost East, were constructed to serve backcountry pack trail activities near the Many Glacier Hotel. The barn was designed in 1938 by the National Park Service Branch of Plans and Design to replace a barn that had burned in the Swiftcurrent Valley fire of 1936, using a simplified form of the National Park Service Rustic style. The bunkhouse was built nearby, then moved directly adjacent to the barn.

See also
Many Glacier Hotel
Many Glacier Campground Camptender's Cabin

References

Residential buildings on the National Register of Historic Places in Montana
Park buildings and structures on the National Register of Historic Places in Montana
Residential buildings completed in 1938
National Park Service rustic in Montana
National Register of Historic Places in Glacier County, Montana
1938 establishments in Montana
National Register of Historic Places in Glacier National Park
Barns on the National Register of Historic Places in Montana